The 1995 Labatt Brier was held from March 5 to 12 at the Metro Centre in Halifax, Nova Scotia. Kerry Burtnyk of Manitoba defeated Brad Heidt of Saskatchewan in the final.

Teams

Round-robin standings

Round-robin results

Draw 1

Draw 2

Draw 3

Draw 4

Draw 5

Draw 6

Draw 7

Draw 8

Draw 9

Draw 10

Draw 11

Draw 12

Draw 13

Draw 14

Draw 15

Draw 16

Draw 17

Tiebreaker

Playoffs

3 vs. 4

1 vs. 2

Semifinal

Final
Sunday, March 12

Statistics

Top 5 player percentages
Round Robin only

Team percentages
Round Robin only

References
CCA Archived statistics

The Brier
Curling competitions in Halifax, Nova Scotia
1995 in Canadian curling
Labatt Brier